Faramea angusta is a species of plant in the family Rubiaceae. It is endemic to Ecuador.

References

angusta
Endemic flora of Ecuador
Near threatened plants
Taxonomy articles created by Polbot